UFC Fight Night: Henderson vs. Khabilov (also known as UFC Fight Night 42) was a mixed martial arts event held on June 7, 2014, at Tingley Coliseum in Albuquerque, New Mexico.

Background
The event was the first that the organization hosted in New Mexico.  Zuffa previously hosted a World Extreme Cagefighting event WEC 32 in nearby Rio Rancho back in 2008.

A lightweight bout between former WEC and UFC Lightweight Champion Benson Henderson and Rustam Khabilov served as the event headliner.

A fight between John Dodson  and John Moraga also took place on the card, the two had previously met back in 2010 at Nemesis Fighting: MMA Global Invasion

Jon Tuck was briefly scheduled to face Yosdenis Cedeno.  However, Cedeno pulled out of the bout citing an injury and was replaced by promotional newcomer Jake Lindsey.

Patrick Cummins was expected to face Francimar Barroso at this event. However, Barroso was forced to pull out due to injury and was replaced by UFC promotional newcomer Roger Narvaez.

Results

Bonus awards
The following fighters were awarded $50,000 bonuses:
 Fight of the Night: Scott Jorgensen vs. Danny Martinez
 Performance of the Night: Benson Henderson and Piotr Hallmann

Reported payout
The following is the reported payout to the fighters as reported to the New Mexico State Athletic Commission. It does not include sponsor money and also does not include the UFC's traditional "fight night" bonuses.

 Benson Henderson: $90,000 (includes $45,000 win bonus) def. Rustam Khabilov: $17,000
 Diego Sanchez: $140,000 (includes $70,000 win bonus) def. Ross Pearson: $30,000 ^
 John Dodson: $40,000 (includes $20,000 win bonus) def. John Moraga: $19,000
 Rafael dos Anjos: $64,000 (includes $32,000 win bonus) def. Jason High: $19,000
 Piotr Hallman: $20,000 (includes $10,000 win bonus) def. Yves Edwards: $24,000
 Bryan Caraway: $20,000 (includes $10,000 win bonus) def. Érik Pérez: $21,000
 Sergio Pettis: $20,000 (includes $10,000 win bonus) def. Yaotzin Meza: $14,000
 Lance Benoist: $20,000 (includes $10,000 win bonus) def. Bobby Voelker: $12,000
 Scott Jorgensen: $52,000 (includes $26,000 win bonus) def. Danny Martinez: $8,000
 Jon Tuck: $16,000 (includes $8,000 win bonus) def. Jake Lindsey: $8,000
 Patrick Cummins: $16,000 (includes $8,000 win bonus) def. Roger Narvaez: $8,000

^Although not reflected in the New Mexico Athletic Commission paperwork, both Sanchez and Pearson received win bonuses.

See also
List of UFC events
2014 in UFC

References

UFC Fight Night
Mixed martial arts in New Mexico
Sports in Albuquerque, New Mexico
2014 in mixed martial arts
Events in Albuquerque, New Mexico